Gav Barg (also Romanized as Gāv Barg; also known as Gāv Bark) is a village in Dasht-e Rum Rural District, in the Central District of Boyer-Ahmad County, Kohgiluyeh and Boyer-Ahmad Province, Iran. At the 2006 census, its population was 101, in 24 families.

References 

Populated places in Boyer-Ahmad County